Monkton is a small village in the parish of Monkton and Prestwick in South Ayrshire, Scotland.

History 
The village was originally known as Prestwick Monachorum.

The Windmill
The tower-like building on the hill was originally a windmill and later a doocot. It is not to be confused with the structure on the opposite side of Prestwick Airport runway, the Shaw Monument, which was originally used by the then landowner to follow hunting with falcons on his land. This vaulted windmill dates from the 17th century, converted to a dovecot in the 18th century when conical slated roof slot for potence and fireclay nesting boxes added. It had two doorways, one blocked.

Views of the area

Climate
Monkton has an oceanic climate (Köppen: Cfb).

Monkton old church 
The church was dedicated to St. Cuthbert and dates from the 13th century. It was in use up until 1837, being suppressed by the Court of Teinds in 1834 and a new united church built near the Pow Burn. The poet Robert Burns' nephew, the Rev Thomas Burns was instrumental in the building of the new church and for a time it was locally known as "Burns's Folly". Burns also wrote the Statistical Account of the parish. It was in Monkton church that Blind Harry's poem The Actes and Deidis of the Illustre and Vallyeant Campioun Schir William Wallace bases the story that William Wallace went to pray, fell asleep and had an inspirational dream which revived his flagging resolve to rescue Scotland from Edward I.

Views of Monkton church and cemetery

Monkton station 
Monkton station opened on 5 August 1859 as part of the Glasgow, Paisley, Kilmarnock and Ayr Railway, later the Glasgow and South Western Railway. The station, now represented by the Prestwick airport fuel unloading sidings, was closed on 28 October 1940 by the London, Midland and Scottish Railway, therefore not even surviving into British Railways days. The closest railway station to the town today is Prestwick International Airport Railway Station opened in 1994

Fairfield House 

Colonel William Fullarton of that Ilk had owned Fairfield, however he sold it before he took up an appointment in Trinidad circa 1803. The property was held in 1851 by William Gunning Campbell at which time the house had a housekeeper, an undergardner, and two housemaids, in addition to the gardener and his laundress wife who lived at Fairfield Cottage. The property had a walled garden which survives as a ruin (2023) and a cemetery garden which remains in fair condition; the old Scottish unit of land measurement called a "fall" is recorded in the inscription. The last Campbell to live at the estate was W. G. Campbell and from the 1860s the property was run by trustees. Fairfield had been known as "Overmains" and had been a part of the lands of Monkton Castle, latterly known as Monkton House.

The associated farms were Fairfield Mains, Monktonmiln, Muirhouse, Orangefield and West Orangefield. Fairfield was sold in 1950 and demolished by the new owner who had planned to build villas and racing stables.

Campbell family Cemetery Garden and Lodge

Orangefield House

James MacRae
Monkton House was rebuilt by James MacRae (1684–1746) who had been the President of Madras, 1725–1730 and came back with a fortune amounting to £100,000. He purchased the estate of  Monkton in 1736 and renamed the house 'Orangefield' as he was a great admirer of William of Orange, William III; he died here in 1746

The MacRae monument
The MacRae Monument or 'Orangefield Family Burial Ground' near the village was built around 1750 by John Swan and is of the Corinthian style, with alcove, urns and obelisk. The site has been referred to as the Orangefield family burial-plot.

References 
Notes

Sources
 Allan, Shiela et al. (2003). Historic Prestwick and its surroundings. Ayr Arch & Nat Hist Soc. .
 Close, Robert (1992), Ayrshire and Arran: An Illustrated Architectural Guide. Pub. Roy Inc Arch Scot. .
 Cuthbertson, David Cuningham (1945). Autumn in Kyle and the Charm of Cunninghame. London : Jenkins.
 Harvey, William. Picturesque Ayrshire. Dundee : Valentine & Sons.
 Love, Dane (2003). Ayrshire : Discovering a County. Ayr : Fort Publishing. .
 Love, Dane (2006). Lost Ayrshire : Ayrshire's Lost Architectural Heritage. Edinburgh : Birlinn Ltd. .
 McClure, David (2002). Ayrshire in the Age of Improvement. Ayrshire Monographs 27. Ayr Arch & Nat Hist Soc. .
 Shaw, James Edward (1953). Ayrshire 1745-1950. A Social and Industrial History of the County. Edinburgh : Oliver & Boyd. 
 Strawhorn, John (1994). The History of Prestwick. Edinburgh : John Donald. .

External links
Video and commentary on the history of St Cuthbert's Church.
Video and commentary on the old Fairfield House garden and burial garden.
Video and commentary on the old Monkton Vaulted Tower Windmill.
Video and commentary on the old Fairfield walled garden.
Video footage of the James Macrae Monument.
Video footage and commentary on James Macrae.
Palace of Engineering.

Villages in South Ayrshire